ImgBurn is an optical disc authoring program that allows the recording of many types of CD, DVD and Blu-ray images to recordable media (.cue files are supported as of version 2.4.0.0). Starting with version 2.0.0.0, ImgBurn can also burn files and data directly to CD or DVD. It is written in C++. It supports padding DVD-Video files so the layer break occurs on a proper cell boundary (where possible).

Prior to version 2.5.1.0, the program was freeware.  From version 2.5.1.0 to 2.5.7.0, Ask.com adware was included in the installer.  This was replaced in version 2.5.8.0 with OpenCandy adware.  Only the version of the installer distributed directly from imgburn.com contains OpenCandy; the version distributed via the official mirror sites is adware-free.  No notice is present on www.imgburn.com that the checksums/hashes provided now only match the OpenCandy version of the installer; however, the author of the program has provided the expected hash values for the adware-free version on the support forum.

History
ImgBurn is an optical disc authoring software created by LIGHTNING UK, the author of DVD Decrypter, after he was forced to stop development of DVD Decrypter in response to a cease and desist order from Macrovision.

Features 

Supported formats: BIN, CUE, DI (Atari Disk Image), DVD, GI, IMG, ISO, MDS, NRG, PDI and more.
Ability to build DVD Video discs (from a VIDEO_TS folder), HD DVD Video discs (from a HVDVD_TS folder) and Blu-ray Video discs (from a BDAV / BDMV folder).
Full unicode folder/file name support.
Supported environments: Windows 95, 98, Me, NT4, 2000, XP, 2003, Vista, 2008, 7 and 2008 R2 (including all the 64-bit versions). It also officially supports Wine.
Image queue provides support for burning several images with minimum interaction.
ImgBurn is relatively lightweight (compared to similar programs); under 1.8MB for all installed features.
ImgBurn is based on the optical disc burning engine of DVD Decrypter; however, it does not have the ability to circumvent copy protections of encrypted DVDs. As of version 2.3.0.0, ImgBurn can create image files from unencrypted CDs/DVDs; however, it cannot remove Content Scramble System (CSS) encryption or any other copy protection. It is possible to use third-party software such as DVD43, an intermediate driver that operates between the hardware and software, for such purpose.

Limits 

Does not support RAW disc ripping or burning
Does not support multi-session discs
Cannot write CD subchannel data
Cannot copy discs directly, without first creating an image file
Each session of the software can only burn to one drive at a time.

Hardware interface support 
ImgBurn supports many low level drive access interfaces. This allows it to operate on almost all Windows platforms. ImgBurn can use any of the following interfaces:
Advanced SCSI Programming Interface (ASPI) – WNASPI32.DLL (Adaptec)
ASAPI – ASAPI.DLL (VOB Computersysteme/Pinnacle Systems)
SCSI Pass Through Interface (SPTI) – Microsoft
ElbyCDIO – Elaborate Bytes
Patin-Couffin – VSO Software

Inclusion of Adware 
Version 2.5.8.0 of ImgBurn (current ) includes OpenCandy, a potentially unwanted program/adware.

See also
AnyDVD
Digital Millennium Copyright Act
InfraRecorder
List of ISO image software
List of optical disc authoring software

References

External links

Official ImgBurn Download Mirror on Softpedia 
 Archive of downloads for all versions of ImgBurn
Another archive of ImgBurn all versions

Optical disc authoring software
Windows-only freeware
Portable software
Adware